Lyrarapax is a radiodont genus of the family Amplectobeluidae that lived in the early Cambrian period 520 million years ago. Its neural tissue indicates that the radiodont frontal appendage is protocerebral, resolving parts of the arthropod head problem and showing that the frontal appendage is homologous to the antennae of Onychophorans and labrum of euarthropods. Its fossilized remains were found in Yunnan in southwestern China. A second species was described in 2016, differing principally in the morphology of its frontal appendages.

Taxonomy 
The scientific name "Lyrarapax" is a compound word of the Latin "lyra" (lyre) and "rapax" (predator), and is named after the outline of the body of this genus, which resembles a stringed instrument called a lyre, as well as its presumed predatory lifestyle.

References

Fossils of China
Anomalocaridids
Fossil taxa described in 2014
Paleontology in Yunnan
Prehistoric arthropod genera

Cambrian genus extinctions